Scythris tugaiensis is a moth species of the family Scythrididae. It was described by Kari Nupponen in 2009. It is found in Uzbekistan. The habitat consists of riverside woods, surrounded by desert steppes.

Description
The wingspan is about 10.5 mm. The forewings are creamy white with dark brown scales forming eight more or less distinct spots. Scattered dark brown scales exist over the wing, more densely at the costal and dorsal areas. The hindwings are fuscous, basally paler.

Etymology
The species name refers to the Tugai forest, the type locality.

References

tugaiensis
Moths described in 2009
Moths of Asia